Segunda Oportunidad (English: Second Chance) is a Mexican reality show produced by TV Azteca and Azteca América that reunites non-winning contestants from the first seven seasons of La Academia as well as La Academia USA and is hosted by Rafael Araneda, Betty Monroe and Miss Universe 2003 Amelia Vega. The 52 contestants, divided into teams of four members each, spend each week at an isolated location learning and developing their artistic skills, then compete against each other during a weekly concert for TV viewers and a live studio audience and face elimination. Producers stated the composition of each team on March 10, 2010.
The 52 contestants will be living in Emilio "Indio" Fernandez's home.

Only 2 contestants were not announced for the competition, but instead were left six hopeful contestants were placed on an online vote, where viewers needed to choose between Jolette, Azeneth, Anahí, Gerardo, Luis Armando, or Raúl Sandoval. On March 17, 2010, the voting was closed; Anahí and Gerardo were chosen.

On April 25, 2010, Diana Galindo (La Academia USA) asked if she can take part in the program. She has been given the chance through an open vote by the public, where they will decide whether she joins the contest or not. On May 9, during concert 7, Diana became the 53rd contestant.

Melissa, Israel, and Alejandra were placed on an open vote by the public, for breaking the show's rules. The public would decide if they could stay for a second chance or go. During the 7th concert, all three were voted to stay and became the part of a new, 14th group: gray.

Contestants

Teams 

 Italics represents the contestant moved to another team
 Bold represents the contestant is/was the captain of the team
 Parenthesis represents the contestants/team was eliminated

Finale Teams

Group Members 

Group 1: Purple...Eliminated 
Dulce López Concert 1-Concert 5
Karla Concert 1-Concert 5
Manuel Concert 1-Concert 4
Abyade Concert 1-Concert 5
Perla (replacement for Manuel) Concert 5
Wendolee (replacement for Dulce López) Concert 5

Group 2: Turquoise
Laura Concert 1-Concert 11
Mayrenne Concert 1-Concert 6
Carlos  Concert 1-Concert 4
Anahi Concert 1-Concert 3
Napoleon (replacement for Carlos) Concert 5-Concert 9
Wendolee (replacement for Anahi) Concert 6-Concert 8
Jose Antonio (replacement for Mayrenne) Concert 7
Adrian (replacement for Jose Antonio) Concert 8-Concert 11
Cesar (replacement for Wendolee) Concert 9-Concert 11
Menny (replacement for Napoleon) Concert 10
Matias (replacement for Menny) Concert 11

Group 3: Red...Eliminated
Agustin  Concert 1-Concert 3
Hector Concert 1-Concert 3
Esteban Concert 1-Concert 3
Luz Concert 1-Concert 3
Andrea Concert 3 (Switched)

Group 4: Yellow
Menny Concert 1-Concert 7 and Concert 11
Andrea Concert 1-Concert 3
Wendolee Concert 1-Concert 5
Ale Concert 1-Concert 4
Agustin (replacement for Andrea) Concert 4-Concert 11
Matias (replacement for Ale) Concert 5-Concert 10
Dulce López (replacement for Wendolee) Concert 6-Concert 8
Oscar (replacement for Menny) Concert 8-Concert 11
Mario (replacement for Dulce) Concert 9
Sebastian (replacement for Mario) Concert 10-Concert 11

Group 5: Green Military
Daniel Concert 1-Concert 11
Alba Concert 1-Concert 10
Oscar Concert 1-Concert 5
Mike Concert 1-Concert 11
Wilfredo (replacement for Oscar) Concert 6
Edgar (replacement for Wilfredo) Concert 7-Concert 11

Group 6: Orange...Eliminated
Sebastian Concert 1-Concert 9
Perla Concert 1-Concert 4
Julia Concert 1
Ivan Concert 1-Concert 3
Melissa (replacement for Julia) Concert 2-Concert 5
Manuel (replacement for Perla) Concert 5-Concert 9
César (replacement for Ivan) Concert 5-Concert 8
Israel (replacement for Melissa) Concert 6-Concert 7
Menny (replacement for Israel) Concert 8-Concert 9
Wendolee (replacement for Cesar) Concert 9
Mario (replacement for Sebastian) Concert 9

Group 7: Black...Eliminated
Adrian Concert 1-Concert 7
Gisela Concert 1-Concert 2
Yadhira Concert 1-Concert 4 and Concert 6-Concert 7
Nohelia Concert 1-Concert 6
Hiromi (replacement for Gisela) Concert 3-Concert 6
Edgar (replacement for Yadhira) Concert 5
Frankie (replacement for Hiromi) Concert 7-Concert 8
Rodrigo (replacement for Nohelia) Concert 7-Concert 8
José Antonio (replacement for Adrian) Concert 8
Mayrenne (replacement for Frankie) Concert 8

Group 8: White
Israel Concert 1-Concert 5
Diana Concert 1-Concert 9
Frankie Concert 1-Concert 6
Mario Concert 1-Concert 8 and Concert 10
Melissa (replacement for Israel) Concert 6-Concert 7
Hiromi (replacement for Frankie) Concert 7-Concert 10
Dulce (replacement for Mario) Concert 9-Concert 10

Group 9: Royal Blue...Eliminated
Hiromi Concert 1-Concert 2
Jaccyve Concert 1-Concert 2
Diego Concert 1
Gerardo Concert 1-Concert 2
Marcos (replacement for Diego) Concert 2

Group 10: Lilac
Jose Antonio Concert 1-Concert 6
Wilfredo Concert 1-Concert 5
Roy Concert 1-Concert 11
Matias Concert 1-Concert 4
Ale (replacement for Matias) Concert 5-Concert 7
Oscar (replacement for Wilfredo) Concert 6-Concert 7
Mayrenne (replacement for Jose Antonio) Concert 7-Concert 8
Diana Galindo (entered the competition on May 9.) Concert 8-Concert 11
Frankie (replacement for Mayrenne) Concert 9-Concert 11
Dulce (replacement for Ale) Concert 11

Group 11: Neon Green...Eliminated
Napoleon Concert 1-Concert 4
Cesar Concert 1-Concert 4
Ana Lucia Concert 1-Concert 4
Cintia Concert 1-Concert 4
Carlos (replacement for Napoleon) Concert 4

Group 12: Fuchsia...Eliminated
Mariana Concert 1
Patricia Concert 1
Melissa Concert 1
Marco  Concert 1
Julia Concert 1

Group 13: Sky Blue...Eliminated
Edgar Concert 1-Concert 4 and Concert 6
Hector Concert 1-Concert 6
Jose Luis Concert 1-Concert 6
Rodrigo Concert 1-Concert 6
Yadhira (replacement for Edgar) Concert 5

Group 14
Israel Concert 8-Concert 11
Melissa Concert 8-Concert 11
Alejandra Concert 8-Concert 11
Napoleon Concert 10-Concert 11

Team Progression

Individual

Team

Program Progression 

 Team with most votes
 Team in danger
 Eliminated team
 Contestant eliminated due to conduct
 Contestant eliminated via switch
 Saved from elimination

References

External links 
 Segunda Oporunidad at TV Azteca Segunda Oportunidad  at Azteca América

La Academia
2010 Mexican television seasons